

Portugal
 Angola – José Rodrigues Coelho do Amaral, Governor-General of Angola (1854–1860)

United Kingdom
 Province of Canada – Sir Edmund Walker Head, 8th Baronet (1854–1861)
 Jamaica – Charles Henry Darling (1857–1863)
 Malta Colony
William Reid, Governor of Malta (1851–1858)
John Le Marchant, Governor of Malta (1858–1864)
 New South Wales – Sir William Denison, Governor of New South Wales (1855–1861)
 Tasmania – Sir Henry Young, Governor of Tasmania (1855–1861)
 South Australia – Sir Richard Graves MacDonnell, Governor of South Australia (1855–1862)
 Victoria – Sir Henry Barkly, Governor of Victoria (1856–1863)
 Western Australia – Sir Arthur Kennedy, Governor of Western Australia (1855–1862)

Colonial governors
Colonial governors
1858